

Other ranks

See also
Comparative army enlisted ranks of the Americas
Ranks and insignia of NATO armies enlisted

References

Military ranks of Hispanophone countries 
Military comparisons